Pemberton House may refer to:

in the United States (by state)
Pemberton House (Beebe, Arkansas), formerly listed on the National Register of Historic Places in White County, Arkansas
Pemberton House (Columbus, Georgia), listed on the National Register of Historic Places in Muscogee County, Georgia
Pemberton Farm, Clark, Kentucky, listed on the National Register of Historic Places in Shelby County, Kentucky
Pemberton's Headquarters, Vicksburg, Mississippi, listed on the NRHP in Warren County, Mississippi
Phineas Pemberton House, Levittown, Pennsylvania, listed on the National Register of Historic Places in Bucks County, Pennsylvania
Pemberton Mansion and Oak, Bristol, Tennessee, listed on the National Register of Historic Places in Sullivan County, Tennessee

See also
Pemberton Hall (disambiguation)

Architectural disambiguation pages